Bagrationovsk (or ;  or ) is a town and the administrative center of Bagrationovsky District in Kaliningrad Oblast, Russia, located close to the border with Poland,  south of Kaliningrad, the administrative center of the oblast. It has a population of

History

In 1325, the Teutonic Knights built an Ordensburg castle called "Yladia" or "Ilaw", later known as "Preussisch Eylau", in the center of the Old Prussian region Natangia. 'Ylow' is the Old Prussian term for 'mud' or 'swamp'. The settlement nearby developed in 1336, but in 1348 the Teutonic Order gave the privilege to establish twelve pubs in the area around the castle. Although the settlement had only a few inhabitants, due to its central position it was often used as meeting place for officials of the Order. In 1454, King Casimir IV Jagiellon incorporated the region to the Kingdom of Poland upon the request of the anti-Teutonic Prussian Confederation. During the subsequent Thirteen Years' War, in 1455, Teutonic Knights regained control of the settlement. The castle was besieged on 24 May 1455 by troops of the Prussian Confederation under the command of Remschel von Krixen, but the garrison repulsed the attack. After the war, in 1466, the settlement became a part of Poland as a fief held by the Teutonic Knights. During the Horsemen's War in 1520, the castle was unsuccessfully besieged by troops of the Polish Kingdom, who devastated the settlement. Following the war, it remained a part of Poland, now as a fief held by newly established secular Ducal Prussia.

Preußisch Eylau received its civic charter in 1585. In 1709–1711, the bubonic plague killed 2,212 inhabitants of the Eylau area.

The Battle of Eylau (7–8 February 1807) during the Napoleonic Wars involved the French troops of Napoleon Bonaparte, the Russian troops of General Bennigsen, and the Prussian troops of General Anton Wilhelm von L'Estocq. Only 3 inhabitants of Eylau died in the battle, but 605 persons died due to hunger and diseases in 1807 (with the average death rate in "normal" years being around 80–90). Napoleon used the local courthouse as his headquarters in Eylau on 7–17 February 1807.

On 1 April 1819, the town became the seat of the administrative district Preußisch Eylau (Kreis Pr. Eylau). In 1834, a Teachers' Seminary was founded, educating every East Prussian teacher until it was closed down in 1924. The town was connected to the railway on 2 September 1866. In the late 19th century, four annual fairs and two weekly markets were held in the town. During World War I, the town was occupied without a struggle by Russian troops on 27 August 1914, but these troops left on 3 September 1914 after massacring 65 civilians.

After 1933, large barracks were built by the Wehrmacht, and in 1935 Infantry and Artillery units were stationed there.

On February 10, 1945, during the Soviet Red Army's East Prussian Offensive, the town was occupied by troops of the 55th Guards "Irkutsk-Pinsk" Division commanded by Major General Adam Turchinsky.

In early August 1945, Polish officials took over the administrative power in the town, which under its historic Polish name Iławka became a county seat, but left again on January 1, 1946, as the new borderline between the Soviet Union and Poland was set just at the southern outskirts of the town. The county seat was then moved to Górowo Iławeckie (now a twin town of Bagrationovsk), however it retained the name  of Iławka County until 1958.

In January 1946, the town became a part of the newly established Kaliningrad Oblast within the Russian SFSR and the town was given its present name, honoring General Pyotr Bagration, who was one of the senior Russian leaders in the Napoleonic Wars and is also the namesake of the 1944 Operation Bagration offensive. The German population that had not already fled during the evacuation of East Prussia during the war was subsequently expelled in accordance with the Potsdam Agreement, with the last transport leaving on November 23, 1947. The NKVD established a prison camp for German civilians inside the former Wehrmacht barracks in 1945–1949. It held an estimated 13,000 inmates, of whom some 6,000 people died.

Since April 2007, government restrictions on visits to border areas have been tightened and travel to Sovetsk and Bagrationovsk is only allowed with special permission, unless in transit.

Administrative and municipal status
Within the framework of administrative divisions, Bagrationovsk serves as the administrative center of Bagrationovsky District. As an administrative division, it is incorporated within Bagrationovsky District as the town of district significance of Bagrationovsk. As a municipal division, the town of district significance of Bagrationovsk is incorporated within Bagrationovsky Municipal District as Bagrationovskoye Urban Settlement.

Population

1782: 1,453
1804: 1,816
1820: 1,631
1846: 2,630
1852: 2,988
1871: 3,719
1885: 3,547
1890: 3,446  (including 42 Catholics, 42 Jews)
1900: 3,248
1910: 3,270
1925: 3,787
1933: 4,123
1939: 7,485  (including 1,185 military personnel)
1946: 2,275  (including 1,339 Germans )
1968: 4,300
1989 Census: 6,728
2002 Census: 7,216
2010 Census: 6,400
2018: 6,482
2021: 6,579

Notable people
Hugo Falkenheim (1856–1945), medical doctor and last Chairman of the Jewish parish of Königsberg
Konrad Theodor Preuss (1869–1938), ethnologist
Robert Kudicke (1876-1961), physician and epidemiologist specializing in tropical medicine, university lecturer in Guangdong and Frankfurt am Main

Twin towns and sister cities

Bagrationovsk is twinned with:
 Verden an der Aller, Lower Saxony, Germany
 Górowo Iławeckie, Poland
 Bartoszyce, Poland
 Jonava, Lithuania

References

Notes

Sources

Horst Schulz. Preußisch Eylau — eine Kreisstadt in Ostpreußen. Lübeck, 1998
Horst Schulz. Der Kreis Preußisch Eylau. Verden, 1983
Wolf, Dr. Horst. Ich sage die Wahrheit oder ich schweige. Leer, 1983

External links
Official website of Bagrationovsk 
Directory of organizations in Bagrationovsk 

Cities and towns in Kaliningrad Oblast
1336 establishments in Europe
Populated places established in the 1330s
Castles in Russia
Poland–Russia border crossings
Bagrationovsky District